Hartford is an unincorporated community in Union Township, Ohio County, in the U.S. state of Indiana.

History
Hartford was laid out about 1817. In its peak years, Hartford was a point on the stagecoach route from Madison to Aurora. Before the flood of 1937 there were four mills, and a general store which opened up in 1978 and closed in the mid-1980s.

A post office was established at Hartford in 1844, and remained in operation until it was discontinued in 1891.

Geography
Laughtery Creek lies to the north of the community.

References

Unincorporated communities in Indiana
Unincorporated communities in Ohio County, Indiana